This is a list of defunct airlines in Comoros.

See also
 List of airlines of Comoros

References

Defunct airlines of the Comoros
Comoros
Airlines
Airlines, defunct